The sooty-capped bush tanager or sooty-capped chlorospingus (Chlorospingus pileatus) is a small passerine bird traditionally placed in the family Thraupidae, but now viewed closer to Arremonops in the Passerellidae. This bird is an endemic resident breeder in the highlands of Costa Rica and western Panama.

The sooty-capped bush tanager is found in mossy mountain forests, second growth and adjacent bushy clearings, typically from 1600 m altitude to above the timberline.  The bulky cup nest is built on bank, in a dense bush, or hidden amongst epiphytes up to 11 m high in a tree. The normal clutch is two pink-brown eggs marked with white.

The adult sooty-capped bush tanager is 13.5 cm long and weighs 20g. The adult has a blackish head with a white supercilium and a grey throat. It has olive upperparts and yellow underparts, becoming white on the belly. Some individuals in the Irazu-Turrialba area are greyer and lack yellow in the underparts. Immatures are browner-headed, duller below, and have a duller olive-tinged supercilium. This species is easily distinguished from common bush tanager by its blacker head and obvious supercilium.

Sooty-capped bush tanagers occur in small groups, or as part of a mixed-species feeding flock. This species feeds on insects, spiders and small  fruits.

The sooty-capped bush tanager's call is a high , and the song is a scratchy  with variations.

References

 Stiles and Skutch,  A guide to the birds of Costa Rica  
 Garrigues and Dean, The Birds of Costa Rica - A Field Guide  

sooty-capped bush tanager
Birds of the Talamancan montane forests
sooty-capped bush tanager
sooty-capped bush tanager